Drumeldrie is a hamlet in the East Neuk area of Fife, Scotland. It is to the east of Upper Largo and is on the A917 road.

It only has one bus-stop marker, which makes bus travel slightly inconvenient westerly.

it is around a 15-minute walk from the main road down to Dumbarnie beach.

References 

Villages in Fife
Levenmouth